A Thousand Shark's Teeth is the second studio album from the American rock group My Brightest Diamond.

Content
The eleven-track album was released on vinyl, compact disc, and digital download with Asthmatic Kitty, on 2 June 2008. It was produced and arranged by Worden, and recorded in Los Angeles, California and New York City, and Berlin, Germany, by Husky Höskulds, who also mixed the album. The album took six years to complete, and was originally conceived to be recorded as string quartet pieces. In comparison with their prior album, Tear It Down, A Thousand Shark's Teeth contains more orchestration, elegant instrumentation and arrangements, and features soprano and pizzicato strings, strings, keys and percussion. It draws comparison to the music of French composer Maurice Ravel, musicians Tricky, Evelyn Glennie and Tom Waits, and the group Portishead.

The bonus track "The Gentlest Gentleman" was included with a download of the album via the iTunes store.

Reception

A review by AllMusic says that "strangely, despite the album's elaborate scope, at times A Thousand Shark's Teeth is too subtle to make a strong initial impression. However, when the album does connect -- usually when the arrangements and melodies are more direct -- the results are stunning. As it stands, A Thousand Shark's Teeth is beautiful, more than a little insular, and ultimately intriguing for anyone willing to listen closely." Pitchfork calls Worden "a creative chameleon with endless wells of technical skill," and says the song "The Gentlest Gentleman" is a "stunningly simple ukelee ditty [that] gives the singer away more than a thousand of violins ever could." 

PopMatters says it is "a swooning, big-gestured album to get lost in[,] discovering new complexities and subtleties each time." A mixed review from The A.V. Club describes A Thousand Shark's Teeth as a "bleaker, creepier expansion of Worden's symphonic rock," but note the song "From the Top of the World" "balanc[es] space, ambient hissing, darkness, mystery, and melody with the patience that made Workhorse catch on."

Track listing
All tracks are written by Shara Worden.

References
Citations

Bibliography

External links
Official press release from mybrightestdiamond.com

2008 albums
Asthmatic Kitty albums
My Brightest Diamond albums